Clavulina decipiens is a species of fungus in the family Clavulinaceae. It was described by British botanist E.J.H. Corner in 1950.

References

External links

Fungi described in 1950
Fungi of Asia
decipiens
Taxa named by E. J. H. Corner